The Local Government Act 1925 (No. 5) was enacted by the Oireachtas of the Irish Free State on 26 March 1925.

The Irish Free State had inherited the structure of local authorities created by United Kingdom legislation, including the Local Government (Ireland) Act 1898 and the Local Government (Ireland) Act 1919. The Act was the first Irish legislation in relation to the local government. The Act abolished rural district councils (except in County Dublin), passing their powers to the county councils. Local elections were held on 23 June 1925.

The abolition of rural districts was extended to Dublin under the Local Government (Dublin) Act 1930.

References

1925 in Irish law
Acts of the Oireachtas of the 1920s
Local government in the Republic of Ireland
Government in the Irish Free State
Local government legislation